Tor Helness (born 25 July 1957) is a Norwegian professional bridge player. He was a stalwart on Norway junior and open teams for thirty years before moving to Monaco. Through 2012 he has won four world championships in  competition. As of October 2016 he ranks second among Open World Grand Masters and his regular partner Geir Helgemo ranks first.

From 1979 to 1981, Helness represented Norway on both its junior and open teams. In 1980 the juniors were European champions (there was yet no world championship) and the open team reached the World Team Olympiad semifinal. For 25 years the open team regularly reached European semifinals, and it won world silver medals in 1993 and 2001. Norway finally won the world team championship in 2007, the biennial Bermuda Bowl, with a team of six including Helness–Helgemo as anchor pair.

The couple Tor and Gunn Helness won the Mixed Pairs (an event without a world championship) at the 2005 European Open Championships. At the inaugural, 2008 World Mind Sports Games in Beijing, Tor Helness won the Open Individual gold medal and Geir Helgemo won the silver. Norway's open team won the bronze.

Emigration to Monaco
From 2011 Helness and his regular Norwegian partner Geir Helgemo are full-time members of a team led and paid by the Swiss real estate tycoon Pierre Zimmermann, under contract expiring 2016. The team finished third in the 2010 world championship, not yet full-time, and it will compete in the European Bridge League open championship this spring. From 2012 all six members will be subjects of the Prince of Monaco and the team will be a prohibitive favorite to represent Monaco internationally in bridge events.
Helness-Helgemo's last appearance representing Monaco was in 2018. After that they switched back to Norway, and where eligible to represent their home country again from 2021.

Bridge career

Major wins

World Championships (5)
Bermuda Bowl (1) 2007
Rosenblum Cup (2) 2006, 2018
World Transnational Open Teams Championship (2) 2009, 2015
North American Bridge Championships (8)
Reisinger (2) 2012, 2013
Vanderbilt (1) 2010
Spingold (3) 2011, 2012, 2018
Jacoby Open Swiss Teams (1) 2005
Open Pairs I (1) 2009
European Championships (5)
Open Teams (1) 2012
Junior Teams (1) 1980
Mixed Teams (1) 2005
Mixed Pairs (1) 2005
European Champions' Cup (1) 2016
Nordic Championships (2)
Open Teams (2) 1980, 1982
Norwegian Championships (34)
Open Pairs (7) 1980, 1982, 1986, 2002, 2003, 2006, 2007
Club Teams (9) 1981, 1984, 1986, 1988, 1989, 2000, 2002, 2004, 2006
Premier League (13) 1980, 1981, 1982, 1985, 1988, 1995, 1998, 2000, 2002, 2003, 2004, 2005, 2014
Swiss Teams (2) 2007, 2008
Mixed Pairs (1) 1991
Mixed Teams (2) 2004, 2012

Other notable wins
Cap Volmac World Top Invitational Pairs (2) 1994, 1996
Macallan Invitational Pairs (2) 1998, 1999
Generali World Masters Individual (1) 2008
Cavendish Invitational Teams (1) 2010
European Winter Games (1) 2016

References

External links
 
 

1957 births
Norwegian contract bridge players
Monegasque contract bridge players
Bermuda Bowl players
Norwegian emigrants to Monaco
Living people
Place of birth missing (living people)
People from Bodø